Turlatovo Airport  is an airport in Ryazan Oblast, Russia located 10 km southeast of Ryazan.  It is a small civilian airstrip, currently with no regular flights. Used for parachute sports, training and occasional small aviation flights.

References
RussianAirFields.com

Airports built in the Soviet Union
Airports in Ryazan Oblast